Hydrogen (1H) has three naturally occurring isotopes, sometimes denoted , , and .  and  are stable, while  has a half-life of  years. Heavier isotopes also exist, all of which are synthetic and have a half-life of less than one zeptosecond (10−21 s).
Of these,  is the least stable, while  is the most.

The symbols D and T are sometimes used for deuterium and tritium. The IUPAC accepts the D and T symbols, but recommends using standard isotopic symbols ( and ) instead to avoid confusion in the alphabetic sorting of chemical formulas. The isotope , with no neutrons, is sometimes called protium. (During the early study of radioactivity, some other heavy radioactive isotopes were given names, but such names are rarely used today.)

List of isotopes

|-
| 
| 1
| 0
| 
| colspan=3 align=center|Stable
| 1/2+
| colspan="2" style="text-align:center" | [, ]
| Protium
|-
| 2H (D)
| 1
| 1
| 
| colspan=3 align=center |Stable
| 1+
| colspan="2" style="text-align:center" | [, ]
| Deuterium
|-
| 3H (T)
| 1
| 2
| 
| 
| β−
| 
| 1/2+
| Trace
|
| Tritium

|-
| 
| 1
| 3
| 
| 
| n
| 
| 2−
|
|
|-
| 
| 1
| 4
| 
| 
| 2n
| 
| (1/2+)
|
|
|-
| rowspan=2|
| rowspan=2|1
| rowspan=2|5
| rowspan=2|
| rowspan=2|
| n ?
|  ?
| rowspan=2|2−#
| rowspan=2|
| rowspan=2|
|-
| 3n ?
|  ?
|-
| 
| 1
| 6
| #
| 
| 2n ?
|  ?
| 1/2+#
| 
|

Hydrogen-1 (protium) 

 (atomic mass ) is the most common hydrogen isotope with an abundance of more than 99.98%. Because the nucleus of this isotope consists of only a single proton, it is given the formal name protium.

The proton has never been observed to decay, and hydrogen-1 is therefore considered a stable isotope. If this prediction is found to be true, then hydrogen-1 (and indeed all nuclei now believed to be stable) are only observationally stable. To date, experiments have shown that the minimum mean lifetime of the proton is in excess of  years.

Hydrogen-2 (deuterium) 

 (atomic mass ), the other stable hydrogen isotope, is known as deuterium and contains one proton and one neutron in its nucleus. The nucleus of deuterium is called a deuteron. Deuterium comprises 0.0026–0.0184% (by population, not by mass) of hydrogen samples on Earth, with the lower number tending to be found in samples of hydrogen gas and the higher enrichment (0.015% or 150 ppm) typical of ocean water. Deuterium on Earth has been enriched with respect to its initial concentration in the Big Bang and the outer solar system (about 27 ppm, by atom fraction) and its concentration in older parts of the Milky Way galaxy (about 23 ppm). Presumably the differential concentration of deuterium in the inner solar system is due to the lower volatility of deuterium gas and compounds, enriching deuterium fractions in comets and planets exposed to significant heat from the Sun over billions of years of solar system evolution.

Deuterium is not radioactive, and does not represent a significant toxicity hazard. Water enriched in molecules that include deuterium instead of protium is called heavy water. Deuterium and its compounds are used as a non-radioactive label in chemical experiments and in solvents for -nuclear magnetic resonance spectroscopy. Heavy water is used as a neutron moderator and coolant for nuclear reactors. Deuterium is also a potential fuel for commercial nuclear fusion.

Hydrogen-3 (tritium) 

 (atomic mass ) is known as tritium and contains one proton and two neutrons in its nucleus. Trace amounts of tritium occur naturally because of the interaction of cosmic rays with atmospheric gases. Tritium has also been released during nuclear weapons tests. It is used in thermonuclear fusion weapons, as a tracer in isotope geochemistry, and specialized in self-powered lighting devices.

The most common method of producing tritium is by bombarding a natural isotope of lithium, lithium-6, with neutrons in a nuclear reactor.

Tritium was once used routinely in chemical and biological labeling experiments as a radioactive tracer. This has become less common, but still happens. D-T nuclear fusion uses tritium as its main reactant, along with deuterium, liberating energy through the loss of mass when the two nuclei collide and fuse at high temperatures.

Hydrogen-4 
 (atomic mass ) contains one proton and three neutrons in its nucleus. It is a highly unstable isotope of hydrogen. It has been synthesized in the laboratory by bombarding tritium with fast-moving deuterium nuclei. In this experiment, the tritium nucleus captured a neutron from the fast-moving deuterium nucleus. The presence of the hydrogen-4 was deduced by detecting the emitted protons.

In the 1955 satirical novel The Mouse That Roared, the name quadium was given to the hydrogen-4 isotope that powered the Q-bomb that the Duchy of Grand Fenwick captured from the United States.

Hydrogen-5 
 (atomic mass ) is a highly unstable isotope of hydrogen. The nucleus consists of a proton and four neutrons. It has been synthesized in the laboratory by bombarding tritium with fast-moving tritium nuclei. In this experiment, one tritium nucleus captures two neutrons from the other, becoming a nucleus with one proton and four neutrons. The remaining proton may be detected, and the existence of hydrogen-5 deduced. It decays through double neutron emission into hydrogen-3 (tritium) and has a half-life of  - the shortest half-life of any known nuclide.

Hydrogen-6 

Hydrogen-7 
 (atomic mass ) consists of a proton and six neutrons. It was first synthesized in 2003 by a group of Russian, Japanese and French scientists at RIKEN's Radioactive Isotope Beam Factory by bombarding hydrogen with helium-8 atoms. In the resulting reaction, all six of the helium-8 neutrons were donated to the hydrogen's nucleus. The two remaining protons were detected by the "RIKEN telescope", a device composed of several layers of sensors, positioned behind the target of the RI Beam cyclotron.

Decay chains
However,  has occasionally been observed to decay directly to stable .

Decay times are in yoctoseconds for all these isotopes except , which is expressed in years.

See also
 Hydrogen isotope biogeochemistry
 Hydrogen-4.1 (Muonic helium)
 Muonium – acts like an exotic light isotope of hydrogen

Notes

References

Further reading

 
Hydrogen
Hydrogen